Jamaica competed in the 2015 Pan American Games in Toronto, Ontario, Canada from July 10 to 26, 2015.

The Jamaican team consisting of 56 athletes in 7 sports was announced on July 3, 2015 by the Jamaica Olympic Association.

Badminton player Gareth Henry was the flagbearer for the team during the opening ceremony.

Competitors
The following table lists Jamaica's delegation per sport and gender.

Medalists

The following competitors from Jamaica won medals at the games. In the by discipline sections below, medalists' names are bolded.

|style="text-align:left; width:78%; vertical-align:top;"|

|style="text-align:left; width:22%; vertical-align:top;"|

Athletics

Jamaica qualified 50 athletes (25 men and 25 women). However, only 41 (21 men and 20 women) eventually competed as the organizers had to reduce the number of athletes competing because too many had been entered into the competition. Athlete Jonique Day was named to the team in the women's 4 × 400 m relay event, but did not compete in the semifinals or final.

Men
Track

Athletes with stars competed in the heats only.

Field

Women
Track

Athletes with stars competed in the heats only. Athletes who competed in the preliminaries were also awarded medals.

Field

Badminton

Jamaica qualified a team of four athletes (two men and two women). The team was named on June 2, 2015.

Men

Women

Mixed

Cycling

Jamaica received a reallocated spot in the men's BMX category.
 
BMX

Diving

Jamaica qualified one male diver.

Men

Golf

Jamaica received a reallocated spot in the men's individual event.

Men

Shooting

Jamaica received a reallocation quota in the men's rifle category.

Men

Swimming

Jamaica qualified five swimmers (four women and one man).

Men

Women

Taekwondo

Jamaica qualified a team of two athletes (one man and one woman).

See also
Jamaica at the 2016 Summer Olympics

References

Nations at the 2015 Pan American Games
P
2015